Bekins Van Lines, Inc. is an American domestic and international private and corporate household goods relocation service provider. Headquartered in Indianapolis, Indiana, Bekins also offers special commodities and logistic services. The United States Military is one of Bekins' largest customers.

History and operations
In 1891, in Sioux City, Iowa, John Bekius and Martin (né Bekius) Bekins, brothers, started a furniture moving business. 

In 1894, Martin Bekins brought the Bekins business to Los Angeles. In 1927, he built his Eagle Rock, Los Angeles estate. 

In 2009, the company had over 300 locations and a fleet of over 2,100 vehicles. The company also owns warehouse space that exceeds four million square feet.

Bekins was acquired by Wheaton World Wide Moving in 2012. After the acquisition, the Bekins Van Lines brand name continued to be used as a separate brand.
 
It is the oldest, currently operating, household moving, company in the United States. It is one of the largest moving companies in North America.

References

Further reading

External links
 

Moving companies of the United States
Agent-owned companies
Companies based in Indianapolis